The 2004 Kilkenny Senior Hurling Championship was the 110th staging of the Kilkenny Senior Hurling Championship since its establishment by the Kilkenny County Board in 1887. The championship began on 25 September 2004 and ended on 31 October 2004.

O'Loughlin Gaels were the defending champions, however, they were defeated by James Stephens at the semi-final stage.

On 17 October 2004, Dicksboro were relegated following a 0–12 to 1–08 defeat by St. Martin's.

On 31 October 2004, James Stephens won the title after a 2–12 to 3–12 defeat of Young Irelands in the final at Nowlan Park. It was their seventh championship title overall and their first title since 1981.

D. J. Carey from the Young Irelands club was the championship's top scorer with 5-35.

Team changes

To Championship

Promoted from the Kilkenny Intermediate Hurling Championship
 Erin's Own

From Championship

Relegated to the Kilkenny Intermediate Hurling Championship
 Mullinavat

Results

First round

Relegation play-off

Quarter-finals

Semi-finals

Final

Championship statistics

Top scorers

Top scorers overall

Top scorers in a single game

References

Kilkenny Senior Hurling Championship
Kilkenny Senior Hurling Championship